A chanchigorri cake, also spelled txantxigorri or chalchigorri, is a Spanish pastry, common in the cuisine of Navarre. These desserts have a rounded shape. They are traditionally made at the time of pig slaughter, and their main ingredients are fried pork, lard, bread dough and sugar. They are usually served warm and are mainly marketed in the autumn months.

Mentions in literature
Chanchigorri cakes appear in the Baztán Trilogy by writer Dolores Redondo.

References

Navarre culture
Spanish pastries
Pork dishes
Basque cuisine
Spanish breads